This is a list of minister from Nitish Kumar's sixth cabinets starting from 27 July 2017. Nitish Kumar is the leader of JD(U) who was sworn in the Chief Ministers of Bihar in August 2017 with help of BJP.

History
Nitish Kumar resigned on 26 July 2017 as Chief Minister of Bihar over differences with the coalition partner RJD due to naming of Tejashwi Yadav, the Deputy Chief Minister and Lalu's son in an FIR by the CBI. Hours later, he joined the NDA which had thus far been the opposition, and secured a majority in the Assembly, taking the Chief Minister-ship once again on the very next day.

Council of Ministers 

|}

See also

 Government of Bihar
 Bihar Legislative Assembly
 Second Nitish Kumar ministry
 Third Nitish Kumar ministry
 Fifth Nitish Kumar ministry

References

Bharatiya Janata Party
Janata Dal (United)
Lok Janshakti Party
2017 in Indian politics
Bihar ministries
Nitish Kumar
2017 establishments in Bihar
Cabinets established in 2017
2020 disestablishments in India
Cabinets disestablished in 2020
6